Zsombor is a Hungarian masculine given name and may refer to:
Zsombor Berecz (born 1986), Hungarian sport sailor
Zsombor Berecz, (born 1995), Hungarian footballer 
Zsombor Borhi (fl. 1990s), Hungarian sprint canoer
Zsombor Deak (born 1989), Romanian triathlete
Zsombor Garát (born 1997), Hungarian ice hockey player
Zsombor Jéger (born 1991), Hungarian actor
Zsombor Kerekes (born 1973), Hungarian footballer
Zsombor Piros (born 1999), Hungarian tennis player
Zsombor Veress (born 1999), Romanian footballer

References

Hungarian masculine given names